Hans Egede Church is an evangelical Lutheran church in Nuuk, Greenland, located in the district of Old Nuuk. The church was consecrated on the 250-year anniversary of the founding of Hans Egede's mission. It is a wooden structure, named after Danish-Norwegian missionary Hans Egede.

The organ of the church is a 10-stop Frobenius organ from 1971.

References

Buildings and structures in Nuuk
Churches in Greenland